Trout Island is an island in Lake Michigan and is part of the Beaver Island archipelago. The island is 80 acres in size, and is privately owned.  There is an airstrip on the island that extends across the whole island to both shorelines. Trout Island is a little under two miles from High Island, and a little over six miles from Beaver Island. The island is part of the Beaver Island Archipelago.

References 

Islands of Lake Michigan in Michigan
Islands of Charlevoix County, Michigan
Private islands of Michigan
Private islands of the Great Lakes